The 1918 Ohio Green and White football team represented Ohio University as a member of the Ohio Athletic Conference (OAC) during the 1918 college football season. Led by first-year head coach Frank Gullum, the Green and White compiled an overall record of 4–0–1 with a mark of 1–0–1 in conference play, placing sixth in the OAC.

Schedule

References

Ohio
Ohio Bobcats football seasons
College football undefeated seasons
Ohio Green and White football